Neeranuch Klomdee (born June 1, 1980 in Bangkok) formerly known as Orranut Klomdee is a track and field sprint athlete who competes internationally for Thailand.

Klomdee represented Thailand at the 2008 Summer Olympics in Beijing. She competed at the 4x100 metres relay together with Sangwan Jaksunin, Jutamass Thavoncharoen and Nongnuch Sanrat. In their first round heat they placed fifth in a time of 44.38 seconds and was the eleventh time overall out of sixteen participating nations. With this result they failed to qualify for the final.

Achievements

References
 

1980 births
Living people
Neeranuch Klomdee
Neeranuch Klomdee
Athletes (track and field) at the 2000 Summer Olympics
Athletes (track and field) at the 2008 Summer Olympics
Asian Games medalists in athletics (track and field)
Athletes (track and field) at the 2002 Asian Games
Athletes (track and field) at the 2006 Asian Games
Athletes (track and field) at the 2010 Asian Games
Universiade medalists in athletics (track and field)
Neeranuch Klomdee
Neeranuch Klomdee
Southeast Asian Games medalists in athletics
Neeranuch Klomdee
Neeranuch Klomdee
Neeranuch Klomdee
Medalists at the 2002 Asian Games
Medalists at the 2010 Asian Games
Competitors at the 2003 Southeast Asian Games
Competitors at the 2005 Southeast Asian Games
Competitors at the 2007 Southeast Asian Games
Competitors at the 2011 Southeast Asian Games
Universiade silver medalists for Thailand
Neeranuch Klomdee
Neeranuch Klomdee
Neeranuch Klomdee